Salaheddine Mezouar ( – born 11 December 1953, Meknes) is a Moroccan politician and Minister of Foreign Affairs from 10 October 2013 until 2017.

Career
In 2004, he was appointed Minister of Industry, Trade and Restructuring of the Economy.

On 15 October 2007, he was appointed Minister of Economy and Finance.

In January 2010, he was elected president of the National Rally of Independents party.

Mezouar is also a former international basketball player.

Treasury controversy
In July 2012 Mezouar was involved in a scandal related to wage bonuses along with Noureddine Bensouda, the chief of the Moroccan treasury. Leaked documents, revealed that Bensouda and Mezouar issued orders to reward themselves with substantial monthly and quarterly bonuses. The bonuses totaled roughly  MAD97,772/month (US$12,000). Mezouar declared that the bonuses were legal basing the decision on a 1941 decree by the French colonial-head which is still enforced. The French decree allowed such bonuses to be issued for high-ranking employees of the colonial administration.

The two employees who revealed this information, Abdelmajid Louiz and Mohammed Reda, were prosecuted and tried for leaking confidential documents. On 21 March 2013, Alouiz was sentenced to two-months suspended prison and a MAD2,000 fine, while Reda was acquitted. However both employees were excluded from their jobs.

See also
National Rally of Independents 
List of foreign ministers in 2017

References

External links
National Rally of Independents 

 

People from Meknes
Moroccan businesspeople
Moroccan economists
1953 births
Living people
Moroccan men's basketball players
Moroccan sportsperson-politicians
Members of the House of Representatives (Morocco)
Government ministers of Morocco
National Rally of Independents politicians
Finance ministers of Morocco
Foreign ministers of Morocco